"Lovin' Every Minute of It" is a song released in 1985 on the Canadian rock band Loverboy's album of the same title. The song reached #9 on the U.S. Billboard Hot 100 becoming their first US Top 10 hit, when released as a single later that year. It was written by Robert John "Mutt" Lange.  In Canada, the song peaked at #11.

Background

Loverboy were almost done writing songs for their upcoming album, but they felt they needed one more song — preferably a big hit — to round out the record. However, everyone in the band was out of ideas. They begged their manager, Mike Shipley, to find someone who could write one more song. Shipley called legendary producer Mutt Lange, who agreed and wrote "Lovin' Every Minute of It" in two or three days. However, Lange was in England while Loverboy were in Canada, and the band needed to know how the song sounded. Singer Mike Reno said,

Charts

References

External links
 

1985 singles
1985 songs
Columbia Records singles
Loverboy songs
Song recordings produced by Bruce Fairbairn
Songs written by Robert John "Mutt" Lange